Costas del Tacuarí (in English Banks of Tacuarí) is a locality in the Treinta y Tres Department of Uruguay. Its limits are the river Río Tacuarí to the north, lake Laguna Merín to the east, the stream Arroyo Zapata to the south and national road Ruta 18 to the west. It is one of the main rice producing areas of Uruguay. The main town of the area is Estación Rincón

External links
Uruguay visual article

Populated places in the Treinta y Tres Department